The Cinque Mulini is an annual cross country running race in San Vittore Olona, Italy. First held in 1933, the course is unusual in that it revolves around a number of water mills along Olona river, which lend the competition its name – meaning Five Mills in Italian. It is one of the IAAF cross country permit meetings that act as qualifiers for the IAAF World Cross Country Championships. As one of the most prestigious meets, numerous world record holders and Olympic champions have competed at the Cinque Mulini throughout its history.

History
Giovanni Malerba organised the first competition in 1933 as a reaction to a competition in a neighbouring village which revolved around seven clock towers. The competition has been held every year since its inception, including throughout the Second World War and in 1939 when the Federazione Italiana di Atletica Leggera (FIDAL) ordered that all cross country competitions be postponed. The course was altered from 10 km to 12 in the late 1930s, in order to accommodate all five mills. The race began to grow after being selected as the course for the Italian Cross Country Championship in 1946 and 1949. The competition became an international one in 1952 and Tunisian runner Ahmed Labidi became the first foreign winner two years later. By the early 1960s, Olympic silver medallist Franjo Mihalić had brought the race to new heights, taking three victories over five editions.

A junior race was introduced in 1960, the first international women's race was held in 1971, and student races were added to the program in the late 1970s. Olympic and World champions graced the course at every edition in the 1970s. By the mid-eighties, East African runners had established themselves, frequently reaching the podium in the senior races. It was part of the IAAF World Cross Challenge the following decade, remaining at the forefront of European cross country running. The course was significantly changed throughout the 2000s, only the Cozzi and Meraviglia mills remained as part of the course and gradually only the semi-functioning Meraviglia was included.

Both former champion David Bedford and meet organiser Vito Garofalo stressed that the competition's longevity is due to, in part, the support the race receives from the local community. The race was elected to serve as the Italian national cross country championships in 1996; Gennaro Di Napoli and Patrizia Di Napoli took the honours.

The event hosted the European Cross Country Club Championships alongside the traditional race in 2011; Portuguese club Grupo Desportivo e Recreativo Conforlimpa won the men's team title while the women's title went to Turkey's Üsküdar Belediyesi Spor Kulübü.

Past senior race winners

National era

International era

Statistics

Winners by country

Multiple winners

Last updated January 2016

See also
Campaccio
European Cross Country Championships
Trofeo Alasport

References
General
Cinque Mulini Men's winners. Cinque Mulini. Retrieved on 2010-02-05.
Cinque Mulini Women's winners. Cinque Mulini. Retrieved on 2010-02-05.

Specific

External links
Official website

Cross country running competitions
Athletics competitions in Italy
Recurring sporting events established in 1933
Sport in Lombardy
Cross country running in Italy
Annual sporting events in Italy
1933 establishments in Italy
Winter events in Italy